Gilpin may refer to:

People 
 Gilpin (surname), including a list of people with the surname

Places

United States
 Gilpin, Kentucky, an unincorporated community in Casey County
 Gilpin, Nevada, an unincorporated community in Storey County
 Gilpin, Richmond, Virginia, a neighborhood
 Gilpin County, Colorado
 Gilpin Peak, a mountain in Colorado
 Gilpin Township, Armstrong County, Pennsylvania

Other places
 River Gilpin, Cumbria, England
 Gilpin, British Columbia, a community in Boundary Country, British Columbia

Other uses 
 Gilpin Airlines, a small airline serving California, Arizona, and the Mexican states of Sonora and Baja California in the 1930s
 Gilpin Baronets, a title in the Baronetage of the United Kingdom
 Gilpin Homestead, Chadds Ford, Delaware County, Pennsylvania, on the US National Register of Historic Places
 Gilpin Railroad, a railroad in Gilpin County from 1887 to 1917

See also 
 John Gilpin, an 1852 clipper ship